In mathematics, Neville's algorithm is an algorithm used for polynomial interpolation that was derived by the mathematician Eric Harold Neville in 1934. Given n + 1 points, there is a unique polynomial of degree ≤ n which goes through the given points. Neville's algorithm evaluates this polynomial.

Neville's algorithm is based on the Newton form of the interpolating polynomial and the recursion relation for the divided differences. It is similar to Aitken's algorithm (named after Alexander Aitken), which is nowadays not used.

The algorithm

Given a set of n+1 data points (xi, yi) where no two xi are the same, the interpolating polynomial is the polynomial p of degree at most n with the property

p(xi) = yi for all i = 0,…,n
This polynomial exists and it is unique. Neville's algorithm evaluates the polynomial at some point x.

Let pi,j denote the polynomial of degree j − i which goes through the points (xk, yk) for k = i, i + 1, …, j. The 
pi,j satisfy the recurrence relation
{|
|  || 
|-
| || 
|}
This recurrence can calculate

p0,n(x),
which is the value being sought. This is Neville's algorithm.

For instance, for n = 4, one can use the recurrence to fill the triangular tableau below from the left to the right.
{| 
| 
|-
| || 
|-
|  || || 
|-
| ||  || || 
|-
|  || ||  || || style="border: 1px solid;" | 
|-
| ||  || || 
|-
|  || || 
|-
| || 
|-
| 
|}

This process yields 

p0,4(x),
the value of the polynomial going through the n + 1 data points (xi, yi) at the point x.

This algorithm needs O(n2) floating point operations to interpolate a single point, and O(n3) floating point operations to interpolate a polynomial of degree n.

The derivative of the polynomial can be obtained in the same manner, i.e:
 
{|
|  || 
|-
|  || 
|}

Application to numerical differentiation

Lyness and Moler showed in 1966 that using undetermined coefficients for the polynomials in Neville's algorithm, one can compute the Maclaurin expansion of the final interpolating polynomial, which yields numerical approximations for the derivatives of the function at the origin. While "this process requires more arithmetic operations than is required in finite difference methods", "the choice of points for function evaluation is not restricted in any way". They also show that their method can be applied directly to the solution of linear systems of the Vandermonde type.

References
 (link is bad)
 J. N. Lyness and C.B. Moler, Van Der Monde Systems and Numerical Differentiation, Numerische Mathematik 8 (1966) 458-464 (doi: 10.1007/BF02166671)
 Neville, E.H.: Iterative interpolation. J. Indian Math. Soc.20, 87–120 (1934)

External links

Polynomials
Interpolation

de:Polynominterpolation#Algorithmus von Neville-Aitken